Demar Stewart (born 15 December 1984) is a Jamaican footballer who plays football. He is the brother of Bristol City defender Damion Stewart.

Career

Club
Stewart played for Jamaican sides Bull Bay and Portmore United before being signed up by Sheffield United in England in 2007. He then loaned out to Belgian lower league outfit White Star Woluwé FC because he did not qualify for a United Kingdom work permit, and was loaned again in early 2008 to Sheffield Unioted's Chinese affiliate Chengdu Blades, becoming the inaugural Jamaican player in the Chinese league.

Stewart made his debut for Chengdu against Dalian Shide in Round 4 of the 2008 season, and went on to play 47 games for the team over the next two season. When Chengdu Blades were relegated following a match-fixing scandal, Stewart left the club.

In 2011, Stewart entered training camp with Orlando City, and played in their first match against Philadelphia Union on 19 February. He signed a contract with the club on 21 February, but did not return for the 2012 season.

International
Stewart progressed through Jamaica's youth programme, representing the country at the Under-17, Under-20 and Under-23 levels, before making his debut for the national team in 2006 in an international friendly against Peru. He has since gone on to make 10 appearances for the Reggae Boyz.

References

External links
 Orlando bio
 Peas in a pod ...Reggae Boy Demar Stewart tries to shake big brother's shadow—interview

1984 births
Living people
Jamaican footballers
Jamaican expatriate footballers
Jamaica international footballers
Portmore United F.C. players
Sheffield United F.C. players
Orlando City SC (2010–2014) players
Chengdu Tiancheng F.C. players
Chinese Super League players
Jamaican expatriate sportspeople in the United States
USL Championship players
Expatriate soccer players in the United States
Expatriate footballers in China
Association football defenders
National Premier League players